Somerset–Bridlewood station is a CTrain light rail station in Somerset, Calgary, Alberta, Canada. It is the current southern terminus of the South Line (Route 201). The station is one of two that opened on June 28, 2004 as part of the South LRT Extension Phase II. The station is located on the exclusive LRT right of way (adjacent to CPR ROW), 16.9 km south of the City Hall interlocking along Shawville Gate. 913 parking spaces are included in the park-and-ride facility at the station.

The station consists of a center-loading platform with at-grade crossings at both ends of the platform.  The platform is also constructed to accommodate a four-car-length train.

In 2005, the station registered an average of 10,100 boardings per weekday. In 2007, the station registered an average of 13,000 boardings per weekday.

References

External links

CTrain stations
Railway stations in Canada opened in 2004
2004 establishments in Alberta